The  was an infantry division of the Imperial Japanese Army. It was formed on 13 March 1943 at Tokyo as a triangular division. The nucleus for the formation was the 61st independent infantry brigade. Because the 61st Division was intended for the garrison duty, it initially did not include an artillery regiment. The division was permanently assigned to the 13th army.

Action
The 61st division was transferred to Nanjing area to replace the 15th division departing for Burma in June 1943. It performed a garrison duties uneventfully until February 1945, when it have formed a mortar company and transferred to Shanghai. In Shanghai area it continued preparations for the anticipated Allies of World War II landing until surrender of Japan 15 August 1945.

See also
 List of Japanese Infantry Divisions

Notes
This article incorporates material from Japanese Wikipedia page 第61師団 (日本軍), accessed 13 June 2016

Reference and further reading

 Madej, W. Victor. Japanese Armed Forces Order of Battle, 1937-1945 [2 vols]
Allentown, PA: 1981

Japanese World War II divisions
Infantry divisions of Japan
Military units and formations established in 1943
Military units and formations disestablished in 1945
1943 establishments in Japan
1945 disestablishments in Japan